Karla Matua (née Clay; born 17 May 1970) is a former Australian rugby union player.

Matua has the honour of being the Wallaroos first capped player, which was presented in 2008. She was born in Whangārei, New Zealand and attended Green Bay High School, and Rutherford College in Auckland. She made her only appearance for Australia in their first international test against the Black Ferns on 2 September 1994 at Sydney.

References 

1970 births
Living people
Australian female rugby union players
Australia women's international rugby union players